The 2022 Rhode Island lieutenant gubernatorial election was held on November 8, 2022, to elect the lieutenant governor of the state of Rhode Island. The election coincided with various other federal and state elections, including for Governor of Rhode Island. Primary elections were held on September 13. Rhode Island is one of 21 states that elects its lieutenant governor separately from its governor.

Incumbent Democratic lieutenant governor Sabina Matos was appointed to the seat in 2021 after the previous incumbent, Dan McKee, ascended to the governorship. McKee was re-elected in 2018 with 61.9% of the vote.

Matos won election to a full term, defeating her Republican opponent Aaron Guckian in the closest race for this office since 1998. She became the first Dominican American to be elected to a lieutenant governor position in the United States.

Democratic primary

Candidates

Nominee
Sabina Matos, incumbent lieutenant governor and former President of the Providence City Council

Eliminated in primary
Cynthia Mendes, state senator
Deb Ruggiero, state representative

Disqualified
Larry Valencia, former state representative

Declined
Aaron Regunberg, former state representative and candidate for lieutenant governor in 2018

Endorsements

Polling

Results

Republican primary

Candidates

Nominee
Aaron Guckian, former aide to former Governor Donald Carcieri

Eliminated in primary
Paul Pence, food safety coordinator and nominee for lieutenant governor in 2018

Withdrawn
Jeann Lugo, police officer

Endorsements

Results

Independents

Candidates

Declared
Keith Harrison, veteran

General election

Endorsements

Results

See also 
2022 Rhode Island elections

Notes 

Partisan clients

References

External links 
Official campaign sites
 Jeann Lugo (R) for Lieutenant Governor
 Sabina Matos (D) for Lieutenant Governor
 Cynthia Mendes (D) for Lieutenant Governor
 Paul Pence (R) for Lieutenant Governor
 Deb Ruggiero (D) for Lieutenant Governor
 Larry Valencia (D) for Lieutenant Governor 

Lieutenant gubernatorial
Rhode Island
Rhode Island lieutenant gubernatorial elections